State Road 574 (NM 574) is a  state highway in the US state of New Mexico. NM 574's southern terminus is at NM 516 in Aztec, and the northern terminus is at NM 170 in La Plata.

Major intersections

See also

References

574
Transportation in San Juan County, New Mexico